Vertigo is the second studio album by Billie Myers, released in 2000.

Production
The album was produced by David Tyson.

Critical reception
AllMusic called the album "another solid set of emotional stories and passionate songs." Vibe wrote that Myers "has developed an ear for consistently potent, often provocative lyrics." The Los Angeles Daily News wrote that "the disc is a lot more diverse than the debut, with infusions of '60s rock, the Beatles and soul."

Track listing
"Am I Here Yet? (Return to Sender)" (David Tyson / Billie Myers) – 4:48
"Should I Call You Jesus?" (Peter Vale / Myers) – 5:10
"Vertigo" (Tyson / Michael Lattanzi / Myers) – 5:40
"Without My Consent" (Vale / Myers) – 3:39
"A Room Full of View" (Desmond Child / Myers) – 6:39
"Flexible" (David Austin / Myers) – 4:31
"Where Romeo Never Dies" (Vale / Myers) – 3:57
"Never Let Them See You Cry" (Tyson / Myers) – 5:35
"Roll Over Beethoven" (Tyson / Myers) – 4:56
"Afraid of Spiders" (Vale / Myers) – 4:39
"Bitter Fruit" (Bruce Roberts / Myers) – 5:45

References

2000 albums
Billie Myers albums
Universal Records albums